Mirnoe may refer to several places in Moldova:

 Mirnoe, a village in Ciobanovca Commune, Anenii Noi district
 Mirnoe, a village in Vinogradovca Commune, Taraclia district

See also
Mirnoye (disambiguation)